The Southern Railway created classification and numbering systems for its large fleet of electric multiple units, perpetuated by the Southern Region of British Rail until the early 1980s, when the impact of TOPS was felt. Some stock is still allocated Southern-style classifications in a semi-official manner.

Classification
The early AC electric multiple units were referred to by a two-letter code. This was adapted for the DC third-rail system that was adopted by the Southern Railway, with units being given a three-letter code (sometimes two letters) prefixed by the number of cars in each unit, e.g. 4SUB for a four-car suburban unit.

The Southern Region perpetuated this, and the same principles were adopted for diesel-electric multiple units but with single-letter codes. The last type to be officially allocated a designation in this series was the PEP stock of the early 1970s. Some types built since have been given semi-official designations in this style.

This is different from the system used by British Rail (adopted from the LNER) to indicate the type of non-powered coach — see British Rail coach type codes.

AC EMUs

DC EMUs

Diesel-electric multiple units

Unit numbering
Unit numbers were allocated from 1001, following the 1–1000 set numbers of semi-fixed formations of hauled coaching stock. Different types of unit were given numbers:

This series was perpetuated by the Southern Region with modifications, as older set numbers were reused for the following different types:

2PEP reused number 2001, 4REP from 3001 and 4PEP 4001/4002. This series was abandoned in 1983, when units were renumbered to fit in with the TOPS classification system, which had nominally been in use for a decade.  Even then, many units displayed only the last four digits, dropping the first two digits – e.g. unit 412 301 would have the number "2301" applied.  Only with later units and 2xx series DEMUs were the full numbers shown, e.g. Classes 456, 458/5, 465 and 466, and some Class 455 sets, carry full six-digit numbers.

See also
 List of British Rail classes
 British Rail brand names

Notes

References

Southern Railway (UK)
Rolling stock classification systems